Fernando Soares Gomes da Silva (born 21 February 1952 in Oporto, Portugal) is a Portuguese football executive serving as Vice-President of the UEFA, the 2nd most important football regulatory in the entire world, only answering to FIFA, which oversees all continents in their football practice.  Since December 2011, he has been the President of the Portuguese Football Federation (Portuguese: Federação Portuguesa de Futebol, FPF), and as of March 2015 a member of the UEFA Executive Committee, besides other UEFA roles.

He is a former basketball player and League President and had a long career with the FC Porto, where he was a member of the management board from 2000 to 2010.

Gomes holds a degree in Economics from the University of Porto.

References

External links

1952 births
Living people
Members of the UEFA Executive Committee
University of Porto alumni
FC Porto
FC Porto basketball players